Sara Hjellström (born 5 November 1993), known professionally as Shy Martin (stylized as shy martin) is a Swedish singer and songwriter. As a songwriter her compositions have been streamed over 3 billion times on Spotify alone, while her songs as lead vocalist have been streamed 1.5 billion times on the same platform.

In August 2020 shy released her Sad Songs EP, preceded by the singles "Slow" and "Are you happy?". The release was well received by blogs including The Line Of Best Fit, Paste and Idolator, and has 120 million+ combined streams on Spotify.

Career 
Raised in the small town of Lerdala, Sweden, shy martin first began writing songs and poetry in her youth as a means of self-expression. After winning a music contest at her school at age 17, shy signed with EMI for a period though ultimately she decided to go independent. She decided to start studying at the songwriting school Musikmakarna in Örnsköldsvik, in the north of Sweden. Shortly after she moved to Stockholm and signed to the independent label BLNK Music. As of November 2020 she is no longer signed with BLNK.

shy martin first established herself as a songwriter, a path that launched in dynamic fashion via her co-write and featured vocal on Mike Perry's "The Ocean (ft. SHY Martin)." Recording the vocals in one-take in her home wardrobe, shy wrote the track with longtime Swedish songwriting partner, SHY Nodi, with whom she has written several other songs for artists including The Chainsmokers, NOTD, Jess Glynne, Astrid S, Timeflies, NEIKED and Kream. The track won Spotify Sweden's ‘Most Streamed Song of the Year’ with a groundbreaking 550 million+ streams (now 719 million+).

shy's career as an artist in her own right took off in 2017 with the release of ‘Good Together’, which was praised by The Line Of Best Fit as “part dancehall, part R&B, and completely addictive”. Several more singles followed, receiving positive coverage from Billboard and others, culminating in the Overthinking EP in 2018. In April 2020, Martin released the single "can I call you back?". James Keith of Complex UK called the song "a dream-like flurry of breathy vocals, soul-touching songwriting and twinkling electronics." This was followed by the Sad Songs EP, her most successful collection to date.

shy's songwriting catalog has gone on to generate over 3 billion streams on Spotify alone including credits on "First Time" by Kygo ft. Ellie Goulding, "(Not) The One" by Bebe Rexha, "All We Know" by The Chainsmokers, "I Wanna Know" by NOTD (ft. Bea Miller), as well as songs for Jess Glynne, Astrid S, and ALMA, among others.

In addition to her artistry, shy is also a member of numerous music industry initiatives, most notably joining Spotify CEO/Founder Daniel Ek and songwriter/producer Max Martin's coveted 'Equalizer Project', a group aiming to combat gender inequality in the music industry. shy also participated in Bebe Rexha’s 2018 'Women In Harmony' Dinner in Los Angeles, a gathering to empower female artists in music including Charli XCX, Kim Petras, and Avril Lavigne. She also performed alongside Matoma at the 2017 Nobel Peace Prize Concert.

In 2018 shy was awarded the Stikkan Anderson award for Songwriting.

shy released her new single 'wish I didn't know you' in October 2022, receiving positive reception from press with Clash Magazine declaring shy ‘a genius...her voice has never been so beautiful’. In February 2023 shy martin released the title track from her debut album 'late night thoughts', being described as ' a departure from her previous work and can be seen as her boldest, most openly emotional, brave, and beautiful release to date'. martin is set to release her debut album in May 2023.

Discography

Studio Albums

Extended plays

Singles

As lead artist 

Notes

Writing credits

Awards and nominations

External links

References

1993 births
Living people
Swedish pop singers
Swedish women singer-songwriters
Swedish songwriters
Swedish singer-songwriters
English-language singers from Sweden
21st-century Swedish singers
21st-century Swedish women singers
Musikförläggarnas pris winners